Joe Frank Burns (born September 15, 1979) is a former American football running back.

High school
Joseph Frank Burns attended Thomas County Central High School in Georgia. Burns was a four-year letterwinner in football, and also won two varsity letters in track.  In football, Burns rushed for 4547 yards and 56 touchdowns during his last two years of high school football, and as a senior, Burns was named the Georgia Player of the Year, and was a USA Today Honorable Mention All-USA selection. Burns also has a cousin in Avon, Indiana named Charles Davis Jr. who plays running back and is a rising star in the area class of 2012.

College
Burns attended Georgia Tech and played for the Yellow Jackets. Burns was an All-Conference running back, and left as the fourth leading rusher in school history.

Retirement
Burns retired in 2006 and co-founded RisingSeniors.com and the Georgia Junior Bowl. RisingSeniors.com has formed a alliance with the NFL Players Association to introduce a character and life skills development program designed to provide resources to assist students dealing with the challenges ahead. It is a free program created to prepare high school junior student-athletes for their senior year by equipping them with the necessary tools to thrive academically, athletically and socially. These skills are important for a successful transition to their senior year, college and beyond. The Georgia Junior Bowl will be the first all-star football game of its kind showcasing the top high school junior football players in the state of Georgia; the purpose of the game is to enhance student athletes recruiting exposure before their senior year. Joseph Frank Burns is also educating high school athletes and families across the country on the college recruiting process as an educational speaker with Upnextrecruiting.com.

References
https://web.archive.org/web/20150727145110/http://www.ramblinwreck.com/sports/m-footbl/mtt/burns_joe00.html 

1979 births
Living people
People from Thomasville, Georgia
Players of American football from Georgia (U.S. state)
American football running backs
Georgia Tech Yellow Jackets football players
Buffalo Bills players